Idriss is the codename for an unknown Canadian militant, used frequently in the testimony of former CIA spy Abdurahman Khadr.

When asked to name Canadians who had attended Khalden training camp with him, Khadr gave several real names, as well as Idriss. He later claimed that Amer el-Maati had given his Canadian passport to Idriss, who used it to enter Azerbaijan in a failed attempt to blow up the American embassy in Baku in 1998.

According to Khadr, Idriss was arrested and sent to Egypt. Azerbaijan has said it secretly turned over two arrested suspects to the United States, although most reports suggest they were sent back to Egypt.

References

Canadian male criminals